Jack and Mike is an American comedy-drama television series created by Sara Davidson that aired on ABC from September 16, 1986, until March 24, 1987.

Premise
Shelley Hack plays Jackie, a newspaper columnist for the fictional Chicago Mirror newspaper. Tom Mason plays Mike, a restaurant owner who operates two of Chicago's trendiest clubs. The two are married and their careers often interfere with one another.

Cast
Shelley Hack as Jackie Shea
Tom Mason as Mike Brennan
Jacqueline Brookes as Nora Adler
Kevin Dunn as Anthony Kubacek
Anthony Baggetta as Rick Scotti
Nouelle Bou-Sliman as Belinda
Carol Rossen as Charlotte
Mills Watson as Max

Episodes

References

External links

1986 American television series debuts
1987 American television series endings
1980s American comedy-drama television series
English-language television shows
American Broadcasting Company original programming
Television series by MGM Television
Television shows set in Chicago